Mikhail Rosheuvel (born 10 August 1990) is a Dutch professional footballer who plays as a winger for TFF First League club Erzurumspor FK.

Career
Rosheuvel was born in Amsterdam. He was added to the Ajax youth academy at a young age due to his impressive skill and speed. However, after only a single year in the club he was sent away. He was quickly picked up by AZ, where he went through the several youth teams. He never made it to the first team, and was signed by second division side, FC Omniworld, where he made his professional debut on 24 August 2009, in a 0–0 home draw against Fortuna Sittard.

Personal life
Born in the Netherlands, Rosheuvel is of Surinamese descent.

Honours
AZ
KNVB Cup: 2012–13

References

External links
 
 Voetbal: International profile 

1990 births
Living people
Dutch footballers
Dutch expatriate footballers
Dutch sportspeople of Surinamese descent
Footballers from Amsterdam
Almere City FC players
AZ Alkmaar players
Heracles Almelo players
SC Cambuur players
Roda JC Kerkrade players
NAC Breda players
Al Dhafra FC players
Büyükşehir Belediye Erzurumspor footballers
Eredivisie players
Eerste Divisie players
UAE Pro League players
TFF First League players
Dutch expatriate sportspeople in the United Arab Emirates
Dutch expatriate sportspeople in Turkey
Expatriate footballers in the United Arab Emirates
Expatriate footballers in Turkey
Association football wingers